Carex gentilis is a tussock-forming species of perennial sedge in the family Cyperaceae. It is native to parts of Tibet, China and Taiwan.

See also
List of Carex species

References

gentilis
Taxa named by Adrien René Franchet
Plants described in 1895
Flora of Tibet
Flora of China
Flora of Taiwan